Matúš Pekár (born 16 March 1984 in Bojnice) is a Slovak football striker who currently plays for Hitra FK in Norway.

External links
 
 FK Haniska Profile
 Eurofotbal profile

References

1984 births
Living people
1. FC Tatran Prešov players
FC Baník Prievidza players
MFK Vranov nad Topľou players
MŠK Rimavská Sobota players
FK Haniska players
Slovak Super Liga players
Association football forwards
Slovak footballers
SK Sigma Olomouc players
FK Ústí nad Labem players
Bohemians 1905 players
Sportspeople from Bojnice